Ritewadi is a village in the Karmala taluka of Solapur district in Maharashtra state, India.

Demographics
Covering  and comprising 98 households at the time of the 2011 census of India, Ritewadi had a population of 522. There were 276 males and 246 females, with 70 people being aged six or younger.

References

Villages in Karmala taluka